The Minister-Presidents of Schleswig-Holstein since 1946 have been:

List
Political party:

See also
Schleswig-Holstein
List of rulers of Schleswig-Holstein
Landtag of Schleswig-Holstein

 
Ministers-President
Schleswig-Holstein
Min